The Eastern basketball team, is a professional men's basketball team of the Eastern Sports Club. The team competes in the Hong Kong A1 Division and the ASEAN Basketball League since 2016.

History

Eastern basketball team is a section of Eastern Sports Club (officially known as Eastern Athletic Association Football Team Limited). In 2015 season the team won  and promoted to 2016 Hong Kong A1 Division Championship. The team became fully professional in 2016. In the same year, the club  would adopt the name Hong Kong Eastern and join the ASEAN Basketball League (ABL).

They won the 2016–17 ABL season, and finished as semifinalists for the next two seasons. They also became Hong Kong A1 Division champions in 2018. The ABL's 2019–20 season was cancelled due to the COVID-19 pandemic. It is scheduled to resume in 2023 with Eastern as among its participating teams. Eastern also plans to join the Chinese Basketball Association in the future.

Home arenas
 Southern Stadium (2016–present)

Season by season 

*Note: Season cancelled due to COVID-19 pandemic.

Current roster

2023 ASEAN Basketball League roster

Past roster

2021–22 ASEAN Basketball League roster

Notable players

To appear in this section a player must have either:
 Set a club record or won an individual award as a professional player.
 Played at least one official international match for his senior national team or one NBA game at any time.

Local players

 Lam Man Chun (2018–21)
 Siu Kin Fan Jon (2018–20)
  Daniel Onwugbonu (2018–19)
 Chan Yik Lun (2018–)
 Ng Chung Tsun (2018–22)
 Ip Chun Fung (2019-)
  Adam Xu (2017–)
 Chen Wan Tin (2021-)
 So Sheung Ying (2017–20)
 Muhammad Sulaiman Sheikh (2019-)
 Pok Yuet Yeung (2019-)
 So Chi Lok Jolin (2017–20)
 Ip Chun Kit (2016–18)
 Lee Shu Wing (2017–18)
 Lau Tsz Lai (2015–20)
 Chung Chun Sing (2016–19)
 Wu Cheuk Pan (2016–)
 Ricky Yang (2015–22)
 Leung Ka Hin Marco (2019-)
 Cheung Pan Yin (2019-20)
 Tang Chi Hang (2015–21)
 Ma Kong San Jeff (2019, 2021)
 Chan Siu Wing (2015–)
 Lee Ki (2015–22)
  Oliver Xu (2022-)
 Ngan Wing Fai (2016-18)
 Poon Chi Ho (2015–17)
 Fong Shing Yee (2015–17)
 Cheng Kam Hing (2015–17)
 Wong Lut Yiu (2013-14, 2015–16)
 Lau Hoi To (2015–16)
 Heung Chun Keung (2015–16)
  Wu Kwok Fung (1992–94, 2014–15)

Import players

 Brandis Raley-Ross (2019–20, 2021–22)
 Brandon Costner (2019–20)
  Joseph Eriobu (2019–20)
  Joshua De Villa (2021-)
  Austin Veloso (2020-)
  Trey Kell (2019)
 T. J. Price (2019)
 Dominic Gilbert (2022-)
 Chris Mclaughlin (2022-)
 Michael Holyfield (2019, 2019–20)
 O'Darien Bassett (2019, 2022-)
 Tonny Trocha-Morelos (2022-)
  Samuel Deguara (2018–19)
 Eric Ferguson (2018)
 Trey Gilder (2018)
  Christian Standhardinger (2017–18)
 Josh Boone (2017)
 Jasonn Hannibal (2017–19)
  Tyler Lamb (2016–18)
  Steven Guinchard (2016–17, 2019–20)
 Patrick Sullivan (2016–17)
 Marcus Elliott (2016–19)
 Ryan O'Neal Moss (2016–18)
 Chris Barnes (2015–17)
 Reggie Johnson (2014–15)
 Bryant Austin (2014–15)

Footnotes

References

External links
  

 
ASEAN Basketball League teams
Basketball teams in Hong Kong
Basketball teams established in 1932
Eastern Sports Club
1932 establishments in Hong Kong